IJmuiden Heliport , sometimes referred to as YPAD, is a small helipad located in the harbour area of the city of IJmuiden in the Dutch province of North Holland. It is exclusively used for maritime piloting services.

References

External links
Airliners.net - Photos taken at IJmuiden heliport

Heliports in the Netherlands
Airports in North Holland
Velsen